Petersburg is a city within Washington Township and the county seat of Pike County, in the U.S. state of Indiana. The population was 2,383 at the 2010 census.

Petersburg is part of the Jasper Micropolitan Statistical Area.

History
Petersburg was laid out in 1817. The city was named for Peter Brenton, an original owner of the town site. A post office has been in operation at Petersburg since 1823.

Geography
Petersburg is located at  (38.491653, -87.280372).

The lower portion of the White River runs through the city.

Climate
The climate in this area is characterized by hot, humid summers and generally mild to cool winters.  According to the Köppen Climate Classification system, Petersburg has a humid subtropical climate, abbreviated "Cfa" on climate maps.

Demographics

2010 census
As the 2010 census, there were 2,383 people, 1,025 households and 592 families living in the city. The racial makeup of the city was 97.7% White, 0.5% African American, 0.3% Native American, 0.5% Asian, 0.2% from other races, and 0.8% from two or more races. Hispanic or Latino of any race were 0.9% of the population.

There were 1,025 households, of which 25.8% had children under the age of 18 living with them, 43.5% were married couples living together, 10.9% had a female householder with no husband present, 3.3% had a male householder with no wife present, and 42.2% were non-families. 37.6% of all households were made up of individuals, and 16.2% had someone living alone who was 65 years of age or older. The average household size was 2.18 and the average family size was 2.89.

The median age was 43.8 years. 20% of residents were under the age of 18; 8.4% were between the ages of 18 and 24; 22.9% were from 25 to 44; 27.6% were from 45 to 64; and 21.1% were 65 years of age or older. The gender makeup was 48.6% male and 51.4% female.

2000 census
At the 2000 census, there were 2,570 people, 1,092 households and 670 families living in the city. The racial makeup was 99.07% White, 0.19% African American, 0.04% Native American, 0.04% Pacific Islander, 0.08% from other races, and 0.58% from two or more races. Hispanic or Latino of any race were 0.39% of the population.

There were 1,092 households, of which 24.7% had children under the age of 18 living with them, 47.1% were married couples living together, 11.1% had a female householder with no husband present, and 38.6% were non-families. 35.5% of all households were made up of individuals, and 17.9% had someone living alone who was 65 years of age or older. The average household size was 2.24 and the average family size was 2.88.

21.6% of the population were under the age of 18, 7.5% from 18 to 24, 26.7% from 25 to 44, 23.4% from 45 to 64, and 20.9% who were 65 years of age or older. The median age was 41 years. For every 100 females, there were 94.4 males. For every 100 females age 18 and over, there were 88.4 males.

The median household income was $27,054 and the median family income was $37,460. Males had a median income of $31,510 and females $21,042. The per capita income was $15,158. About 6.7% of families and 11.6% of the population were below the poverty line, including 9.9% of those under age 18 and 16.7% of those age 65 or over.

Industry
One coal-fired power-plant: Indianapolis Power & Light (IPL)'s Petersburg Generating Station, is within two miles of Petersburg. There are also two coal mines within ten miles of Petersburg. Hoosier Energy's Frank E. Ratts Generating Station was torn down during late 2016 and early 2017 and the site has been graded and seeded.

Education
Petersburg has a public library, a branch of the Pike County Public Library.

Notable people
 Jody Davis, guitarist for Newsboys
 Samuel Hugh Dillin, judge
 John W. Foster, journalist and diplomat, U.S. Secretary of State
 Thomas L. Hisgen, nominee for President of the United States of the Independence Party in 1908
 Melba Phillips, physicist and science educator
 Gil Hodges, Hall of Fame baseball player and manager
 Clyde Lovellette, professional basketball player
 John Wesley Posey, abolitionist
 Joe Wyatt, professional baseball player

References

External links
 City of Petersburg, Indiana website

 
Cities in Indiana
Communities of Southwestern Indiana
Cities in Pike County, Indiana
County seats in Indiana
Jasper, Indiana micropolitan area